James Neilson may refer to:

 James Beaumont Neilson (1792–1865), Scottish inventor of iron-smelting processes
 James Crawford Neilson (1816–1900), Baltimore, Maryland architect
 James Neilson (director) (1909–1979), film and television director
 James Neilson (footballer) (1887–1917), Scottish footballer
 James Neilson (racing driver) (died 1953), Scottish racing driver
 Jim Neilson (born 1941), aka James Anthony "Chief" Neilson, professional ice hockey player